The 2021–22 Women's FA Cup was the 52nd staging of the Women's FA Cup, a knockout cup competition for women's football teams in England. Chelsea were the defending champions, having beaten Arsenal 3–0 in the 2020–21 final which was delayed due to the COVID-19 pandemic and eventually played on 5 December 2021.

The final was won by Chelsea who beat Manchester City after extra time at Wembley Stadium in front of a record attendance of 49,094.

Teams 
A total of 417 teams entered the 2021–22 Women's FA Cup, an increase of 41 from the previous year. Unlike previous years, there were no additional preliminary rounds prior to first round qualifying. Tier 5 teams were given an exemption for the first time, entering at the second round qualifying stage. The 50 teams that play in the FA Women's National League Division One (tier 4) are given exemption to the third round qualifying, while teams in the Northern and Southern Premier Divisions (tier 3) enter at the first round proper. Also for the first time, teams in the FA Women's Super League and FA Women's Championship (tiers 1 and 2) entered in different rounds with Championship teams exempt until the third round proper, one round earlier than in previous years, while FA WSL teams remained exempt until the fourth round proper.

First round qualifying
The competition started at the first round qualifying stage with 76 matches played in September 2021, made up of teams from the seventh-tier county leagues and randomly drawn tier six regional second division teams.

Second round qualifying
120 matches were played in the second round qualifying in October 2021, made up of the 76 winning teams from the first round qualifying and included the introduction of 164 teams from the fifth-tier regional first division football leagues and the and remaining sixth-tier teams.

Third round qualifying
85 matches were played in the third round qualifying in October 2021, made up of the 120 winning teams from the second round qualifying and including the introduction of 50 teams from the fourth-tier FA Women's National League Division One.

First round proper
56 matches were played in the first round proper in November 2021, made up of the 85 winning teams from the third round qualifying and included the introduction of 27 from teams the third-tier FA Women's National League Premier Division.

Second round proper
28 matches were played in the second round proper in November 2021, made up of the 56 winning teams from the first round proper and did not include the introduction of any new teams.

Third round proper
20 matches were played in the third round proper in December 2021, made up of the 28 winning teams from the second round proper and included the introduction of 12 teams from the second-tier FA Women's Championship.

Fourth round proper
16 matches were played in the fourth round proper on 29 and 30 January 2022, made up of the 20 winning teams from the third round proper and included the introduction of 12 teams from the first-tier FA Women's Super League. The fourth round proper was the final round to introduce new teams.

Fifth round proper
Eight matches were played in the fifth round proper on 26 and 27 February 2022, made up of the 16 winning teams from the fourth round proper.

Quarter-finals
Four matches were played in the quarter-finals on 18 and 20 March 2022, made up of the eight winning teams from the fifth round proper.

Semi-finals
Two matches were played in the semi-finals on 16 and 17 April 2022, made up of the four winning teams from the quarter-finals.

Final

The final was played at Wembley Stadium on Sunday 15 May 2022.

Television rights

References

For the BBC match Attendances, look under the Line ups section

Women's FA Cup seasons
Cup
Women's FA Cup